Hamlet is a 1974 filmed adaptation of John Bell and Richard Wherrett's theatre production of the play.

Cast
Jeff Ashby		
John Bell		
Max Cullen
Ken Lawrence		
Roger Newcombe		
John Paramor		
Anna Volska

References

External links

Australian television films
1974 television films
1974 films
Films directed by Julian Pringle
1970s English-language films
1970s Australian films